Guangzhou is a city in China's Guangdong Province.

Guangzhou may also refer to:

Guǎng Prefecture (廣州), a historical prefecture in modern Guangdong, Hong Kong, and Macau, China
Guāng Prefecture (光州), a historical prefecture in modern Henan and Anhui, China
3048 Guangzhou, a main-belt asteroid
COSCO Guangzhou, a container ship
Guangzhou dialect, another name for Cantonese, particularly as spoken in Guangzhou
Guangzhou Peninsula, a headland in Antarctica

See also
 Gwangju (disambiguation), its Korean equivalent
 Canton (disambiguation)